Ambodimandresy is a rural municipality in Madagascar. It belongs to the district of Antsohihy, which is a part of Sofia Region. The population of the commune was estimated to be approximately 10,000 in 2001 commune census.

The municipality covers 14 villages (fokontany) :
Ambodimandesy, Ambohimandririna, Antambohitra, Antombodriha, Ambodimanga-Bora, Antanamarina, Zafibelaza, Antanambao-Nord, Andampy, Andamoty, Andrafialava, Ambalarano, Ambalahonko and Mangaoko.
It is situated at 3 km North of the National Road 6 that links this municipality to Antsohihy (29 km). It is principally inhabited by the Tsimihety

References 

Populated places in Sofia Region